The 2014 Hastings Borough Council election was held on Thursday 22 May 2014 to elect members of Hastings Borough Council in East Sussex, England. Half of the council was up for election, and Labour remained in overall control of the council. The election took place on the same day as elections to the European Parliament.

After the election, the composition of the council was:
Labour 24 (+1)
Conservative 8 (-1)

Election result

Ward results
Comparisons for the purpose of determining a gain, hold or loss of a seat, and for all percentage changes, is to the last time these specific seats were up for election in 2010.

References

2014 English local elections
2014
2010s in East Sussex